Helander is a surname. Notable people with the surname include:

Arne Anders Vilhem Helander (born 1941), Finnish architect
Bernhard Helander (1958–2001), writer on Somalia
Dick Helander, (1896–1978) Swedish bishop
Filip Helander (born 1993), Swedish footballer
Hans Peter Helander (born 1951), Swedish hockey player
Olle Helander (1919–1976), Swedish music journalist
Tuija Helander (born 1961), Finnish hurdler